Luis del Sol Cascajares (6 April 1935 – 20 June 2021) was a Spanish football midfielder and manager.

He played a total of 112 La Liga games for Betis and Real Madrid (28 goals scored), winning five major titles with the latter side and earning several Ballon d'Or nominations. He later had brief spells as manager with the former club.

Del Sol represented Spain in two World Cups, in the 1960s.

Club career

Betis and Real Madrid
Del Sol was born in Arcos de Jalón, Province of Soria, relocating with his family to Andalusia at age two months. In his country, he played for Real Betis and Real Madrid; with the former club he was part of the squad that was promoted to La Liga (1958), appearing in 40 games in that level over the course of one and a half seasons and scoring six goals.

Signing with the Merengues in April 1960 for 6 million pesetas, del Sol netted a career-best 17 times in his first full season, while not missing one single minute of action in his 29 appearances as his team won the national championship, after starting the year with the Intercontinental Cup triumph against Peñarol.

Italy
In the summer of 1962, aged 27, del Sol moved abroad and signed for Juventus FC, becoming the club's first ever Spanish player and the third Spaniard in the Serie A. He was assigned the number 10 shirt in 1965 following Omar Sívori's departure to S.S.C. Napoli, and appeared in 292 competitive matches during his spell in Turin (228 in Serie A, 26 in the Coppa Italia and 38 in European competitions), scoring 29 goals (20/6/3), winning the domestic cup in 1965 and the league title two years later. 

In 1970, del Sol joined A.S. Roma, collecting 57 appearances and scoring four goals during his two-year stint in the Italian capital and also serving as team captain, just as compatriot Joaquín Peiró had before him. In total, he remained one full decade in Italy.

Later years
Del Sol returned to Betis for the 1972–73 campaign. After suffering top-flight relegation the 38-year-old decided to retire from football, going on to later coach the club for several spells, starting with its youth sides and being in charge for 13 games as they returned to division one in 2001.

International career

Del Sol earned 16 caps for the Spain national team, scoring three goals. His debut came on 15 May 1960 at the Santiago Bernabéu Stadium, playing the second half of a 3–0 friendly win against England.

Del Sol represented the country at the 1962 and 1966 FIFA World Cups (playing four matches in total), and was also part of the championship-winning squad at the 1964 European Nations' Cup, although he did not appear in the final stages.

International goals
Scores and results list Spain's goal tally first, score column indicates score after each del Sol goal.

Style of play
A complete midfielder, del Sol was considered to be one of the best players in the world in his position during the 1960s. A physically strong, dynamic, intelligent and technically skillful player, he was mainly known for his pace, work-rate, tenacity and stamina, and was also noted for his ability to chase down opponents, break down the opposition's moves and subsequently start attacking plays for his team, courtesy of his movement off the ball and distribution. In addition to his abilities as a footballer, he was also known for his strong character, leadership, temperament and dedication on the pitch.

Because of his ability to cover the pitch, del Sol's Real Madrid teammate Alfredo Di Stéfano gave him the nickname the postman.

Death
Del Sol died on 20 June 2021 in Seville, at the age of 86.

Honours

Club
Betis
Segunda División: 1957–58

Real Madrid
La Liga: 1960–61, 1961–62
Copa del Generalísimo: 1961–62
European Cup: 1959–60
Intercontinental Cup: 1960

Juventus
Serie A: 1966–67
Coppa Italia: 1964–65

Roma
Anglo-Italian Cup: 1972

International
Spain
UEFA European Championship: 1964

References

External links

 
 
 Real Madrid biography 
 Biography at Real Madrid Fans 
 
 
 

1935 births
2021 deaths
Sportspeople from the Province of Soria
Spanish footballers
Footballers from Castile and León
Association football midfielders
La Liga players
Segunda División players
Real Betis players
Real Madrid CF players
Serie A players
Juventus F.C. players
A.S. Roma players
UEFA Champions League winning players
Spain under-21 international footballers
Spain B international footballers
Spain international footballers
1962 FIFA World Cup players
1964 European Nations' Cup players
UEFA European Championship-winning players
1966 FIFA World Cup players
Spanish expatriate footballers
Expatriate footballers in Italy
Spanish expatriate sportspeople in Italy
Spanish football managers
La Liga managers
Segunda División managers
Real Betis managers
Recreativo de Huelva managers